Chah Qazi (also Romanized as Chāh Qāz̤ī; also known as Chāh Qāsemī, Chāh Qāsī, and Hājjī ʿAlī) is a village in Zirtang Rural District, Kunani District, Kuhdasht County, Lorestan Province, Iran. At the 2006 census, its population was 186, in 36 families.

References 

Towns and villages in Kuhdasht County